Erik Marquardt (born 20 October 1987) is a German politician who is serving as a Member of the European Parliament for the Alliance 90/The Greens political party.

References

External links

Living people
MEPs for Germany 2019–2024
Alliance 90/The Greens MEPs
1987 births